Terellia sabroskyi is a species of tephritid or fruit flies in the genus Terellia of the family Tephritidae.

Distribution
Greece.

References

Tephritinae
Insects described in 1982
Diptera of Europe